Nina Søby (born 4 August 1956) is a Norwegian former professional racing cyclist. She won the Norwegian National Road Race Championship in 1980 and 1983. She also competed at the 1984 Summer Olympics in Los Angeles, where she placed 18th in the individual road race.

References

External links

1956 births
Living people
Norwegian female cyclists
Sportspeople from Hamar
Olympic cyclists of Norway
Cyclists at the 1984 Summer Olympics